Kevin Mathias Lewis Rodríguez (born 8 January 1999) is a Uruguayan professional footballer who plays as a midfielder for Uruguayan Primera División club Albion on loan from Peñarol.

Club career
Lewis is a youth academy graduate of Peñarol. He made his professional debut for the club on 27 May 2018 in a 2–1 league win against Atenas. On 16 April 2021, he joined Sud América on a season long loan deal.

On 14 July 2022, Lewis joined Albion on a one-year loan deal.

International career
Lewis is a former Uruguayan youth international. He has made seven appearances for Uruguay's under-18 team.

Honours
Peñarol
 Uruguayan Primera División: 2018
 Supercopa Uruguaya: 2022

References

External links
 
 Kevin Lewis, from watching Forlán on television in Cebollatí to having him as a technician in Peñarol

1999 births
Living people
Association football midfielders
Uruguayan footballers
Uruguay youth international footballers
Uruguayan Primera División players
Peñarol players
Sud América players